Slap a Ham Records was an independent label from San Francisco owned and operated by Chris Dodge. d The label lasted for about 13 years, officially shutting down in 2002. According to Dodge, this was due because of the September 11 attacks; "After the attacks, everyone stopped spending money" and as a result, Slap a Ham faced stagnate commerce, causing Dodge to go into debt.

Discography
This list is organized by catalog number. All three Bllleeeeaaauuurrrrgghhh compilations were only released on 7" vinyl. All CD releases are bootlegs.

References

External links
 

Defunct record labels of the United States
Hardcore record labels
Powerviolence
Punk record labels